Kitulu Day Secondary School is a secondary school located in Machakos County, Eastern Province, Kenya. It was established in 2001 to cater for the bright students from Kivandini (Kipandini) Division and its environs, whose parents could not afford the fees charged in boarding school.
Its first Principal was Mwikya P (2nd was/is Kituu P.) He was instrumental in acquiring more land for the school as the one donated by Kitulu Primary School was very small. The school has been performing relatively well in the district having attained position 1 on several occasions.(District schools).

The school's board of governors is chaired by Hon Kikuyu (Former M.P. Machakos Town Constituency.)

References 

Education in Eastern Province (Kenya)
Machakos County
Educational institutions established in 2001

High schools and secondary schools in Kenya
2001 establishments in Kenya